Michael S. Sells (born July 28, 1945) is an American politician of the Democratic Party. He is a member of the Washington House of Representatives, representing the 38th district. He was born in Seattle.

References

Democratic Party members of the Washington House of Representatives
Living people
1945 births
21st-century American politicians